Bulgarian-Dutch relations are foreign relations between Bulgaria and the Netherlands.  Bulgaria has an embassy in The Hague. The Netherlands has an embassy in Sofia. Both countries are members of the European Union and the NATO.
the Netherlands has given full support to Bulgaria's membership in the European Union and NATO.

Country comparison

Royal Visits to Bulgaria 
 Beatrix of the Netherlands and Prince Claus of the Netherlands
 6–8 October 1999 - Sofia, Burgas and Nesebar
 The Prince of Orange
 25–26 May 2009 - Sofia

Diplomacy

Republic of Bulgaria
The Hague (Embassy)

of the Netherlands
Sofia (Embassy)

See also 
 Foreign relations of Bulgaria
 Foreign relations of the Netherlands
 Bulgarians in the Netherlands
 Dutchs in Bulgaria
 Accession of Bulgaria to the European Union

References

External links
  Bulgarian embassy The Hague 
   Dutch Ministry of Foreign Affairs about relations with Bulgaria (in Dutch only) 
  Dutch embassy Sofia

 

 
Netherlands

Bilateral relations of the Netherlands